Abe Goldstein (September 10, 1898 – February 12, 1977) was an American bantamweight boxer from New York. He defeated Joe Lynch to become World Bantamweight champion on March 21, 1924, in Madison Square Garden, and was ranked the #5 bantamweight of all time by boxing Manager Charley Rose. He worked with the famous New York trainer Ray Arcel.

He successfully defended the title twice the year he took it, against Charles Ledoux and Tommy Ryan, before losing to Eddie "Cannonball" Martin in a 15-round decision on December 19, 1924. He had an unsuccessful attempt at the American Flyweight Championship early in his career against Johnny Buff and fought Pancho Villa, another holder of the American Flyweight Title in a non-title match.

Early life and career
Goldstein was born in the slums of New York's Lower East Side on September 10, 1898, and spent some of his early years in an orphanage. His widowed mother made a living wheeling a pushcart in New York's Lower East Side, occasionally having to steal rolls from local bakeries to feed her family. He got his earliest ring experience with Nat Osk, the athletic instructor at the 92nd YMHA of Manhattan, who taught him elementary boxing.  After fighting for three years as an amateur flyweight, Willie Lewis, who usually acted as his promoter, took note of his potential and developed him into an exceptional young contender.  He won a series of amateur titles including the Metropolitan, New York State, New England, Middle Atlantic, and National Titles for amateurs at the weight of 112 pounds.  Ray Arcel, his exceptional trainer, began working with him even before he turned professional in 1916. Unlike several of Arcel's bantamweight fighters, Goldstein rarely had trouble making weight, a trick (problem) for many bantams.  According to Arcel, "The one thing we had on our side was that Abe could eat a ton of bricks and never weight more than 116 pounds."

In his first forty professional fights, he was reputed to have lost only five times by points decisions.  Of Goldstein's first 40 bouts, 16 wins were by knockout.

He had several losses in 1920. One was to Paddy Owens on September 18, 1920, in a twelve-round points decision in Waterbury, Connecticut. Of his August 21, 1920, twelve-round loss by newspaper decision to Young Montreal in Hartford, Connecticut, the Boston Post wrote that Montreal was "far and away the cleverer boxer" and his hooks, "took a heavy toll from Goldstein's strength."  Perhaps his most important early loss was in a non-title fight with bantamweight champion Joe Lynch in an eleventh-round knockout in Madison Square Garden on November 5, 1920, when Goldstein was substituting for another boxer.  A left and a right to the chin of Goldstein ended the bout, but the two would meet again four years later.

American Flyweight Championship against Johnny Buff and Filipino boxer Pancho Villa
On March 31, 1921, he received what might be considered his first title shot against American flyweight champion Johnny Buff, but was knocked out in the second round at the Manhattan Casino in New York. Patsy Haley, one of America's most accomplished referees in the New York area, officiated.

Match with Pancho Villa
On November 16, 1922, he lost to Pancho Villa, Filipino holder of the American Flyweight Championship in a fifteen-round bout in Madison Square Garden by unanimous decision.  The bout drew an impressive but rowdy audience.  Villa won the decision by "decisively outpointing and outpunching his heavier rival," and appeared to be the aggressor in most of the rounds, with the possible exception of the fifth where Goldstein scored with two left hooks.  Around 12,000 viewed the bout, with a very large crowd being turned away. The unruly crowd tore off one of the doors of the stadium, and booed and hissed at Goldstein's passiveness and lack of response to Villa's aggression, but Goldstein may have been wise to fight a purely defensive bout.  One source noted that the bout was not a title match, as Goldstein weighed in at 115 1/2 against Villa's 110 pounds.  The two had previously met in a twelve-round bout on June 7, that ended in a newspaper decision for Goldstein, which surprised many who noted Villa's dominance in their November 16 match.

Match with Joe Burman, interim bantamweight champion
On October 19, 1923, he defeated Joe Burman in a twelve-round decision at Madison Square Garden.  Goldstein was substituting for Joe Lynch, who had been stripped of his title, partly for avoiding the match against Goldstein.  Burman had been temporarily assigned the Bantamweight Championship in New York State as a result of Lynch's being stripped of the title.  Goldstein was given five rounds, Burman three, and the rest were declared even. Later discussion by the New York State Athletic Commission restored the bantamweight title to Lynch, though Goldstein would soon have a shot at his crown.

World Bantamweight Champ, 1923
On October 29, 1923, Goldstein defeated Joe Burman in a close twelve round points decision in Madison Square Garden, though according to Ray Arcel, Goldstein had not fully trained for the bout.  By many accounts, the bout was a Bantamweight Title Match, but since Burman only held the title as a result of it being temporarily stripped from Joe Lynch, who had refused to meet Burman in a title match on the same date, most sources attribute Goldstein's victory over Lynch five months later as the date when he officially took the World Bantamweight Title.  Goldstein's victory over Burman, whom most considered a valid World Bantamweight Contender, gave Goldstein a far stronger claim to contend for the World Bantamweight Championship, and Arcell considered it a critical victory in building his reputation as a championship caliber trainer as well.

Of his epic win against Joe Lynch on March 21, 1924, the Wilkes-Barre Evening News wrote "Lynch fought a game, courageous battle, but he was not equal to the task of warding off the relentless attack of his challenger who gave a splendid exhibition of scientific boxing." Though Goldstein landed repeatedly with his left and landed many solid blows that rocked Lynch, the reigning champion was never knocked down and never appeared to be at risk of being knocked out.  Ray Arcel, one of the most skilled and accomplished boxing trainers in history was in Goldstein's corner for the fight.  Arcel considered Goldstein's victory as one of his great achievements, as Goldstein was the first boxer he had trained to a World Championship.  He noted that during training for the fight he and Goldstein, "played together, laughed together and wept together."  Both were Jewish and had roots in New York's lower East side, Arcel being from Harlem.

The News noted that the capacity crowd of 14,900 at Madison Square Garden witnessed a "stirring, hard fought battle with Goldstein assuming the lead almost from the start, and continuing to pile up points throughout the fifteen rounds." The News gave only the tenth round decisively to Lynch, who for the first time in the battle landed his signature right hand to the chin of Goldstein.  The result of the fight was not a foregone conclusion in the minds of most fans, as Wilmington's Evening Journal noted that Lynch had been the big favorite on the night of the match.

World Bantamweight defenses

One of his critical title defenses was a fifteen-round Unanimous Decision against Charles Ledoux on July 16, 1924, at New York's Metropolitan Velodrome.  Famed American sportswriter Damon Runyan wrote of the fight in his typically humorous style that most of the folks in the audience "expected to see Charles Ledoux expire of senility and Goldstein's punches long before the fifteenth." Ledoux was thirty-one at the time of the bout, considerably old for a boxer, to Goldstein's more youthful twenty-five.  Ledoux had reigned for ten years as European Bantamweight Champion, and considered retirement after the bout, but did not. The Winnipeg Tribune called the fight, "a tame, uninteresting fifteen round exhibition", and noted that "The crowd, a scant 5000, booed the exhibition and hissed the decision", perhaps anticipating a more rousing spectacle. The Tribune noted, as had Runyon, that Ledoux had been down twice in the bout, and was very game to last the full fifteen rounds.

He defended his title again against Tommy Ryan on September 8, 1924, in Long Island City, in Queens, New York, in a fifteen-round points decision. The referee was again the renowned Patsy Haley, who officiated at many important New York title fights and had fought primarily as a lightweight in New York at the turn of the century. Goldstein had fought and defeated Ryan twice previously in non-title fights.  In the simplest terms, "Goldstein had a wide and comfortable margin." According to the Reading Times Goldstein had a significant lead over Ryan after the seventh round. According to the times, "In the eighteenth round, Goldstein, working from long range, swung his battery of rights and lefts into action and drove the reeling Ryan about the ring punchdrunk and on the verge of a knockout." The Times also noted in the fifteenth round Ryan appeared close to a knockout but finished the round nonetheless.

On May 27, 1924, he atypically lost a ten-round points decision to Johnny Shepherd in Boston.  Shepherd was awarded eight of the ten rounds.  His opponent's lefts and countering rights gained the winning edge in the points awarded by the judges.

Losing of Bantamweight Title
On December 19, 1924, he lost the World Bantamweight title to Eddie "Cannonball" Martin in a split decision in fifteen rounds before a crowd of 15,000 at New York's Madison Square Garden. Some newspapers wrote that the close bout should have gone to Goldstein and that the match was marred by too much clinching. Though both boxers, particularly Martin, showed aggressiveness in the bout, one newspaper noted "Goldstein weakened toward the end, and it was only by dint of holding that he saved himself from the Cannonballs's rushes." Though "in round twelve Abe's right reached Martin's jaw half a dozen times", Martin seemed to last through Goldstein's best shots.  One source characterized the referee's ruling in the bout as a "razor thin decision."

The Lincoln Star wrote that Goldstein had an advantage in the first six rounds, particularly the third, but that Martin showed aggression and put Goldstein on the defensive so often that he eventually won the decision. Goldstein's trainer Arcel, believed that his fighter's dominance in the first six rounds, particularly the third when he knocked down Martin, should have been enough for a decision, but he admitted that the fight was close.

The Ashbury Park Press, agreeing with the decision for Martin, wrote that Goldstein appeared to be on the defensive too often and clinched repeatedly as a reaction to Martin's onslaught. The Press wrote that "although the former champion (Goldstein) was not seriously hurt by the fighting, he was unable to return it in any measure and constantly looped his fingers about his opponent's arms to save himself punishment.  Most telling was the line by the Press that "round after round saw him (Martin) forcing the fighting giving double for what he received." In short, "Goldstein lost his belt by taking the defensive and acquiescing to the infighting methods that Martin employed."

Boxing after title loss
He lost 20 of the 23 fights he boxed after losing the World Bantamweight title to Eddie Martin. Facing some top notch talent, he boxed several opponents who would eventually hold world titles.

On March 19, 1925, immediately after his loss to Martin, Goldstein defeated Tommy Milton in twelve rounds at the Rink Sporting Club in New York.  Goldstein landed the heavier blows, particularly  a vicious right to the chin of Tommy in the seventh round that put him on the mat for a count of nine.

Goldstein boxed Charles "Bud" Taylor three times after 1925. Goldstein lost twice with one no decision. An important loss to Taylor was on May 26, 1925, consisting of ten rounds in Queensborough Stadium in New York. The Pittsburgh Post characterized the bout as the "best performance of his (Taylor's) career", and identified Taylor as "the class of the bantamweight division."

Taylor would take the bantamweight title in June 1927, one month after his third fight with Goldstein.  Of his May 4, 1927, ten-round loss to Taylor at New York's Colliseum, the Decatur Herald wrote that Taylor was "easily the master of the bout, but suffered some hard punches from the former title holder (Goldstein) and several times the crowd was plainly cheering for a Goldstein victory.

On April 23, 1926, Goldstein beat Hall of Fame Black Panamanian boxer Panama Al Brown in ten rounds in New York. The fighting was described as fast paced. As a result of a reach disadvantage, Brown being four inches taller at 5' 9", Goldstein fought at long distance which improved his chances at defense. Though Brown had the advantage during in-fighting, Goldstein seemed to have a points advantage from the early rounds, and his lead was never in question throughout the bout.  Brown, a black Panamanian, would become the first Latin American to hold the NYSAC World Bantamweight Title three years later in 1929.

Of his December 14, 1926, ten-round unanimous decision at the Armory in Wilkes-Barre, Pennsylvania with local boxer Johnny Dunn, the Wilkes-Barre Record wrote that the crowd was unhappy with the verdict, and probably would have preferred at least a draw. "There were no knockdowns", with both boxers fighting a fast and clean battle.  The crowd was probably displeased with both boxers  "throwing punches at each other from all angles without inflicting damage."

Last bout
On June 25, 1927, Goldstein's had his last professional fight with Filipino boxer Ignazio Fernandez in a seventh-round TKO in Chicago, Illinois.  Fernandez dropped Goldstein for a count of nine with strong right crosses to the chin in the sixth round. The bout was called by referee Davey Miller in the seventh when Fernandez again dropped Goldstein with a new flurry of rights."

Goldstein retired that year. By 1929, after the collapse of Wall Street, he was forced to drive a cab to make a living. His professional record, according to BoxRec, counting newspaper decisions, for 135 bouts, was 101 wins, 24 losses, 9 draws, and 1 no contest. He had an impressive thirty-five knockouts among his wins.

He died February 12, 1977 in New York.

Professional boxing record
All information in this section is derived from BoxRec, unless otherwise stated.

Official Record

All newspaper decisions are officially regarded as “no decision” bouts and are not counted in the win/loss/draw column.

Unofficial record

Record with the inclusion of newspaper decisions in the win/loss/draw column.

See also
List of bantamweight boxing champions
List of select Jewish boxers

References

External links
Cyber Boxing Zone bio
 
Jews in Sports bio

|-

 

1898 births
1977 deaths
Boxers from New York City
Jewish American boxers
Jewish boxers
World boxing champions
World bantamweight boxing champions
Bantamweight boxers
American male boxers
20th-century American Jews